En gång till is a 1990 studio album from Swedish dansband Lotta & Anders Engbergs orkester.

Track listing

References

1990 albums
Lotta & Anders Engbergs orkester albums